The 1999 Kilkenny Senior Hurling Championship was the 105th staging of the Kilkenny Senior Hurling Championship since its establishment by the Kilkenny County Board. The draw for the opening round fixtures took place on 12 July 1999. The championship began on 21 August 1999 and ended on 24 October 1999.

Graigue-Ballycallan were the defending champions.

On 24 October 1999, Glenmore won the title after a 1–14 to 2–08 defeat of Graigue-Ballycallan in the final at Nowlan Park. It was their fifth championship title overall and their first title in four championship seasons. It remains their last championship triumph.

Team changes

To Championship

Promoted from the Kilkenny Intermediate Hurling Championship
 Clara

From Championship

Relegated to the Kilkenny Intermediate Hurling Championship
 Dunnamaggin

Results

First round

Relegation play-offs

Quarter-finals

Semi-finals

Final

Championship statistics

Top scorers

Overall

Single game

References

Kilkenny Senior Hurling Championship
Kilkenny Senior Hurling Championship